Estero Calbuco is a creek in Biobio Region of Chile.

References

Rivers of Chile
Landforms of Biobío Region